David Graham Blanchflower,  (born 2 March 1952), sometimes called Danny Blanchflower, is a British-American labour economist and academic. He is currently a tenured economics professor at Dartmouth College, Hanover, New Hampshire. He is also a research associate at the National Bureau of Economic Research, part-time professor at the University of Glasgow and a Bloomberg TV contributing editor. He was an external member of the Bank of England's interest rate-setting Monetary Policy Committee (MPC) from June 2006 to June 2009.

British-born, Blanchflower is now both a British and an American citizen, having moved to the United States in 1989. He was appointed Commander of the Order of the British Empire (CBE) in the 2009 Birthday Honours.

Education
Blanchflower attended Varndean Grammar School for Boys in Brighton and Cantonian High School in Cardiff. He went on to earn a B.A. in Social Sciences (Economics) at the University of Leicester in 1973 and a Postgraduate Certificate in Education at the University of Birmingham in 1975. He received an MSc (Economics) at the University of Wales in 1981 and his PhD in 1985 at Queen Mary, University of London. He was also awarded an honorary A.M. in 1996 at Dartmouth College and an honorary Doctor of Letters at the University of Leicester in 2007, an honorary Doctor of Science from Queen Mary College, University of London in July 2009 and an honorary Doctor of Letters from the University of Sussex in July 2011.  He was awarded an honorary fellowship by Cardiff University in 2014.

Work in economics
Blanchflower served as a Research Officer at the Institute for Employment Research at University of Warwick from 1984 to 1986, when he became a lecturer at the Department of Economics at the University of Surrey, a post he held until 1989 when he moved to the United States.

He has been a member of the Editorial Board of Small Business Economics, Scottish Journal of Political Economy, and Industrial and Labor Relations Review.

He has also been a research associate at the Centre for Economic Performance at the London School of Economics and at the Canadian International Labour Network.

The Wage Curve
Blanchflower's The Wage Curve (with Andrew Oswald), with eight years of data from 4 million people in 16 countries, argued that the wage curve, which plots wages against unemployment, is negatively sloping, reversing generations of macroeconomic theory. "The Phillips Curve is wrong, it's as fundamental as that," said Blanchflower.  The Guardian praised the findings as "one of the most devastating findings of contemporary economics". The implications, that wages are highest when unemployment is lowest and that increased unemployment drives down wages, have been suggested periodically in economics since the publication of Karl Marx's Wage-Labour and Capital.

Happiness
Much of Blanchflower's work has focused on the economics of happiness. He has posited a correlation between age and happiness, declining through the 20s, 30s, and 40s before increasing in retirement. He has been labelled a "happiness guru" for his ability to quantify the increase in happiness for individuals who are married or have sex frequently, work which has applications in divorce law and pharmaceutical advertising.

He has been interviewed several times on NPR and New Hampshire Public Radio about his work in this area.

Monetary Policy Committee
Blanchflower joined the Bank of England's Monetary Policy Committee in June 2006, replacing Stephen Nickell. Before his appointment, Michael Fallon questioned his non-residency at the parliamentary Select committee on Treasury. Blanchflower attended a number of meetings by conference call. During his tenure, he voted in the minority in eighteen of thirty six meetings. He voted to maintain the interest rate in his first nine meetings, but to reduce interest rates in March 2007 and in every meeting from October 2007 through March 2009.

Six other members of the MPC have served during Blanchflower's time on the MPC. Blanchflower continually voted for rate cuts. At the September 2008 MPC meeting, Blanchflower distanced himself further from consensus by voting for a 0.5% 'cut' against the other eight members' 'hold'.

In the Autumn of 2008, the worldwide economic situation began to deteriorate dramatically, most clearly evidenced by dramatic falls in the values of shares worldwide. On 8 October 2008, the BOE took part in a set of simultaneously announced cuts in the policy rate of a number of major Central Banks. The MPC eventually came around to Blanchflower's view and subsequently lowered rates to levels never before seen in the Bank of England's existence and moved to do unprecedented levels of quantitative easing.

In March 2009, it was announced that Blanchflower would be replaced by David Miles at the end of his term, 31 May 2009.

Current work 
David Blanchflower is the Bruce V Rauner professor of economics at Dartmouth College, New Hampshire, part-time professor at the University of Stirling, a research associate at the National Bureau of Economic Research, and a contributing editor for Bloomberg TV. On 27 September 2015, it was announced that he had been appointed to the British Labour Party's Economic Advisory Committee, convened by the then Shadow Chancellor John McDonnell and reporting to the then Labour Party Leader Jeremy Corbyn, for whom he is undertaking an independent review of the Bank of England, although he has stated that he is not a Corbyn supporter and has never spoken to him. Blanchflower quit the panel and said he would also wind up his review of the role of the Bank of England on 28 June 2016 following the mass resignations of the Shadow Cabinet, joining them in calling for Corbyn to step down.

Personal life 
Blanchflower and his then wife were parties in the notable case of Blanchflower v. Blanchflower. The case resulted in a landmark decision by the New Hampshire Supreme Court which ruled that sexual relations between two females, one of whom is married, does not constitute adultery because it is not technically sexual intercourse. The case was overturned in April 2021 by the NH Supreme Court in the case of Blaisdell v Blaisdell.

Publications 
 Not Working: Where Have All The Good Jobs Gone? , Princeton University Press, 2019
 With David N.F. Bell, 'The Well-being of the Overemployed and the Underemployed and the Rise in Depression in the UK', Journal of Economic Behavior and Organization, volume 161, May, pp. 180–196, 2019.
 With David Bell, 'Underemployment in Europe and the United States', forthcoming Industrial and Labor Relations Review.
 With Andrew Oswald, 'Unhappiness and pain in Modern America: a review essay, and further evidence, on Carol Graham's Happiness for All?', Journal of Economic Literature, 57(2), pp. 385–402, 2019.
 With David Bell, 'The lack of wage growth and the falling NAIRU', National Institute Economic Review, No. 245, August, pp. R1-R16, 2018.
 With David Bell, 'Underemployment and the Lack of Wage Pressure in the UK', National Institute Economic Review, No. 243, February, pp. R53-R61, 2018.
 With Andrew Oswald, 'Antidepressants and Age: A New Form of Evidence for U-shaped Well-being Through Life', Journal of Economic Behavior & Organization 127, pp. 46–58, 2016.
 'Hard times are only going to get harder' British Journal of Sociology, 66(3), September, pp. 577–583, 2015. 
 'As Good as it Gets? The UK Labour Market in Recession and Recovery', National Institute Economic Review February, 231: pp. F76-F80, 2015.
 With David Bell, 'Youth unemployment in Greece: measuring the challenge', IZA Journal of European Labor Studies, 29 January 2015
 With David N.F. Bell, Alberto Montagnoli, and Mirko Moro, 'The happiness tradeoff between unemployment and inflation', Journal of Money Credit and Banking, Supplement to vol 46(2), October, pp. 117–141, 2014.
 With David N.F. Bell, 'Labour Market Slack in the UK', National Institute Economic Review No. 229 August, F4-F11, 2014.
 With David Bell 'Underemployment in the UK revisited', National Institute Economic Review, NO 224, pp. F8-F22, May, 2013.
 With Andrew Oswald and Sara Stewart-Brown, 'Is psychological well-being linked to the consumption of fruit and vegetables?’, Social Indicators Research, December, Volume 114, Issue 3, pp 785–801, 2013.
 With Andrew Oswald, 'Is Well-being U-Shaped over the Life cycle?', February 2007. https://www.nber.org/papers/w12935

Footnotes

External links

Danny Blanchflower (Twitter)
Blanchflower's website at Dartmouth College
Who's Blanchflower 
Blanchflower's IZA Bio
Prof. David Blanchflower (Bank of England)

1952 births
Labor economists
21st-century American economists
British economists
Business commentators
Dartmouth College faculty
Academics of the University of Surrey
Academics of the University of Warwick
Alumni of Queen Mary University of London
Alumni of the University of London
Alumni of the University of Leicester
Alumni of the University of Wales
Living people
Commanders of the Order of the British Empire
Alumni of the University of Birmingham
Academics of the University of Stirling